Dice (1925–1927) was an American Champion Thoroughbred racehorse. Bred by Harry Payne Whitney, he was purchased as a yearling by Gladys Mills Phipps who raced him under her Wheatley Stable banner.

After making a winning debut in an overnight race at Jamaica Race Course in New York, Dice went on to win four straight important races for his age group. After a one-mile workout at Saratoga Race Course in preparation for the following weeks Saratoga Special Stakes, Dice suddenly began bleeding from the nostrils and died.

Dice was retrospectively voted co-winner with Reigh Count as the American Champion Two-Year-Old Colt for 1927, an award won by his sire Dominant in 1915.

See also
List of leading Thoroughbred racehorses

References

1925 racehorse births
1927 racehorse deaths
Thoroughbred family A1
Racehorses bred in Kentucky
Racehorses trained in the United States
American Champion racehorses